"And the Crowd Goes Wild" is a song recorded by American country music singer Mark Wills.  It was released in July 2003 as the first single and title track from his album of the same name.  The song reached #29 on the Billboard Hot Country Singles & Tracks chart.  The song was written by Jeffrey Steele and Craig Wiseman.

Content
"And the Crowd Goes Wild" is an up-tempo song with country rap influences, that tells the story of typical low-down junkies and wannabes, such as a NASCAR junkie, and a honky-tonk singer, and how they soon "shine like a superstar." The song's bridge features sports commentary by George Plaster.

Critical reception
A review by Maria Konicki Dinoia of AllMusic said the song is a get-out-of-your-seat rocker that's bound to inspire.

Music video
The music video opens with Wills as a newscaster, then later performing for an audience. The video was directed by Peter Zavadil.

Chart performance

References

2003 singles
2003 songs
Mark Wills songs
Songs written by Jeffrey Steele
Songs written by Craig Wiseman
Song recordings produced by Chris Lindsey
Mercury Records singles
Music videos directed by Peter Zavadil